Anatoly Zhukov (born 13 June 1991) is a Belarusian footballer.

On 16 January 2020, the BFF banned Zhukov for 12 months for his involvement in the match fixing.

References

External links

1991 births
Living people
Belarusian footballers
Association football defenders
FC Minsk players
FC Kommunalnik Slonim players
FC Polotsk players
FC Slonim-2017 players
FC Naftan Novopolotsk players